Spyridium halmaturinum, commonly known as Kangaroo Island spyridium, is a species of flowering plant in the family Rhamnaceae and is endemic to Kangaroo Island in South Australia. It is an erect, sticky shrub with densely softly-hairy young stems, leaves that are heart-shaped with the narrower end towards the base to broadly wedge-shaped or Y-shaped, and dense heads of white to cream-coloured flowers.

Description
The edges of the leaves are turned down or rolled under, the tip is often forked with two lobes, and both surfaces are covered with soft, star-shaped hairs.

Taxonomy
This species was first formally described in 1855 by Ferdinand von Mueller who gave it the name Trymalium halmaturinum in his Definitions of rare or hitherto undescribed Australian plants. In 1863, George Bentham changed the name to Spyridium halmaturinum in Flora Australiensis. The specific epithet (halmaturinum) is derived from the Latin word halmaturus meaning "kangaroo", referring to Kangaroo Island, where this species is endemic.

Distribution and habitat
Spyridium halmaturinum grows in coastal heath, shrubland and mallee woodland, mainly on the southern half of Kangaroo Island in South Australia.

References

halmaturinum
Rosales of Australia
Flora of South Australia
Taxa named by Ferdinand von Mueller
Plants described in 1855